Thad Levine  (born November 12, 1971) is an American baseball executive. He is the senior VP and general manager for the Minnesota Twins of Major League Baseball.

Early life and education
Levine was born in Alexandria, Virginia. He played youth soccer with Paul DePodesta. Levine attended Haverford College, where he played NCAA Division III college baseball. He attained his bachelor's degree in 1994. He also graduated from the University of California, Los Angeles in 1999 with an MBA.

Career
Levine joined the Los Angeles Dodgers in business development. He moved to the Colorado Rockies in 1999, and worked there successively as an assistant director, director, and senior director. Levine was appointed to the position of Texas Rangers assistant general manager in October 2005. He was hired as the Minnesota Twins general manager on November 3, 2016.

References

External links
"Interview:  Mile High Manager," 4/19/05

Baseball executives
Haverford Fords baseball players
UCLA Anderson School of Management alumni
1971 births
Living people
Sportspeople from Alexandria, Virginia
Los Angeles Dodgers executives
Colorado Rockies executives
Texas Rangers executives
Minnesota Twins executives